OpenSciEd is an American nonprofit organization that creates open source science education materials and curricula for all grades, initially focusing on grades 6-8. OpenSciEd's approach is based on a science storyline, where students build upon their understanding of a topic by asking questions and investigating their answers through various activities. It has been adopted by 10 states. All materials are reviewed by and follow Next Generation Science Standards.

Participating States 
OpenSciEd has been adopted by California, Iowa, Louisiana, Massachusetts, Michigan, New Jersey, New Mexico, Oklahoma, Rhode Island, and Washington. However, because of the difficulty in switching from traditional education, not all districts in states which adopted the new standards use OpenSciEd.

Funding 
OpenSciEd funders include the Bill and Melinda Gates Foundation, the Carnegie Corporation of New York, the Charles and Lynn Schusterman Family Foundation and the William and Flora Hewlett Foundation.

Approach to Education 

According to OpenSciEd, traditional education frequently only pays attention to the point of view of experts, and doesn't consider how students view what they are learning. Because of this, many students don't understand why they are learning what they are, and don't connect the various concepts together. OpenSciEd attempts to solve this by creating a science storyline, where questions of phenomena lead to investigations, which link together to give students a good understanding of the topic.

References 

Open education
Open educational resources